Belarus participated in the Eurovision Song Contest 2007 with the song "Work Your Magic" written by Karen Kavaleryan and Philip Kirkorov. The song was performed by Dmitry Koldun. The Belarusian entry for the 2007 contest in Helsinki, Finland was selected through the national final Eurofest 2007, organised by the Belarusian broadcaster National State Television and Radio Company of the Republic of Belarus (BTRC). The national final was a televised production which consisted of a semi-final and a final held on 15 December 2006 and 22 January 2007, respectively. Fifteen competing acts participated in the semi-final where three entries qualified to the final: one entry selected by a public televote and two entries selected by a seven-member jury panel. In the final, the jury panel selected "Work Your Magic" performed by Dmitry Koldun as the winner.

Belarus was competed in the semi-final of the Eurovision Song Contest which took place on 10 May 2007. Performing during the show in position 4, "Work Your Magic" was announced among the top 10 entries of the semi-final and therefore qualified to compete in the final on 12 May. It was later revealed that Belarus placed fourth out of the 28 participating countries in the semi-final with 176 points. In the final, Belarus performed in position 3 and placed sixth out of the 24 participating countries, scoring 145 points.

Background 

Prior to the 2007 Contest, Belarus had participated in the Eurovision Song Contest three times since its first entry in 2004. The nation's best placing in the contest was thirteenth in the semi-final, which it achieved in 2005 with the song "Love Me Tonight" performed by Angelica Agurbash. In 2006, Belarus failed to qualify to the final with the song "Mum" performed by Polina Smolova.

The Belarusian national broadcaster, National State Television and Radio Company of the Republic of Belarus (BTRC), broadcasts the event within Belarus and organises the selection process for the nation's entry. Since 2004, BTRC has organised a national final in order to choose Belarus' entry, a selection procedure that continued for their 2007 entry.

Before Eurovision

Eurofest 2007 
Eurofest 2007 was the national final format developed by BTRC to select the Belarusian entry for the Eurovision Song Contest 2007. The competition consisted of a semi-final and final held on 15 December 2006 and 22 January 2007, respectively. Both shows were hosted by Denis Kurian and Olga Schlager and broadcast on the First Channel and Belarus TV as well as online via the broadcaster's official website tvr.by.

Competing entries 
Artists and composers were able to submit their applications and entries to the broadcaster between 25 October 2006 and 20 November 2006. At the closing of the deadline, 66 entries were received by the broadcaster. Auditions were held between 29 November and 1 December 2006 at the Youth Variety Theater in Minsk where a jury panel was tasked with selecting up to fifteen entries to proceed to the televised national final. The jury consisted of Mihail Finberg (chairman of the jury, director of the Belarusian State Academic Symphony Orchestra), Vladimir Rylatko (deputy head of the Belarusian Ministry of Culture), Vasily Rainchik (musician/composer), Alexander Tikhanovich (national final project manager), Denis Shpitalnikov (head of music and entertainment programmes of BTRC), Anatoly Yarmolenko (director of the ensemble Syabry) and Yadviga Poplavskaya (singer). Fifteen semi-finalists were selected and announced on 5 December 2006.

Semi-final 
The televised semi-final took place on 15 December 2006 at the Republic Palace in Minsk. Prior to the semi-final, a draw for the running order took place on 14 December 2006. Three songs qualified to the final. The fifteen competing entries first faced a public televote where one song advanced: "Angel mechty" performed by Dmitry Koldun. An additional two qualifiers were selected from the remaining fourteen entries by the votes of jury members made up of music professionals: "How Long" performed by Diana Gurtskaya and "Super Star" performed by The Project.

In addition to the performances from the competitors, the show featured guest performances by 2003 Belarusian Junior Eurovision contestant Volha Satsiuk and 2006 Belarusian Eurovision contestant Polina Smolova.

Final 
The televised final took place on 22 January 2007 at the Sports Palace in Minsk. Prior to the final, Dmitry Koldun opted to change his song as the national final rules set by BTRC allowed for the finalists to completely change their candidate songs. The votes of jury members made up of music professionals selected the song "Work Your Magic" performed by Dmitry Koldun as the winner.

In addition to the performances from the competitors, the show featured guest performances by former Belarusian Eurovision contestants Aleksandra and Konstantin (2004), Angelica Agurbash (2005) and Polina Smolova (2006), former Belarusian Junior Eurovision contestants Ksenia Sitnik (2005) and Andrey Kunets (2006), former Eurovision Song Contest winners Carola (1991) and Marie N (2002), 2006 Latvian Eurovision contestants Cosmos and 2006 Russian Eurovision contestant Dima Bilan.

Preparation 
The official music video of the song, filmed in February 2007 and directed by Oleg Gusev, was presented to the public on 8 March 2007 on the First Channel. The concept of the video was based on the music video of the song "Jaded" by American band Aerosmith.

Promotion 
Dmitry Koldun made several appearances across Europe to specifically promote "Work Your Magic" as the Belarusian Eurovision entry. Between 3 February and 5 March, Dmitry Koldun performed "Work Your Magic" during the Greek, Irish, Macedonian, Montenegrin and Spanish Eurovision national finals, and the presentation shows of the 2007 Cypriot and Bosnian Eurovision entries. In February and April, Koldun participated in promotional activities in Russia where he performed the Russian version of "Work Your Magic", titled "Day mne silu", during the Channel One programmes Novye pesni o glavnom and Vysshaya liga, as well as during the NTV programme Glavniy Geroy. Between 13 and 15 April, Koldun performed during events which were held in Antwerp and Brussels, Belgium, as well as appearing during the RTL 4 programme Life & Cooking in The Netherlands. In addition to his international appearances, Dmitry Koldun also participated in promotional activities in Belarus where he performed during the Za Nezavisimuyu Belarus event, which was at the Minsk Hero City Obelisk in Minsk on 25 March.

At Eurovision

According to Eurovision rules, all nations with the exceptions of the host country, the "Big Four" (France, Germany, Spain and the United Kingdom) and the ten highest placed finishers in the 2006 contest are required to qualify from the semi-final in order to compete for the final; the top ten countries from each semi-final progress to the final. On 12 March 2007, a special allocation draw was held which determined the running order for the semi-final on 10 May 2007. Belarus was drawn to perform in position 4, following the entry from Cyprus and before the entry from Iceland.

For the Eurovision Song Contest, Dmitry Koldun performed under the artistic name of Koldun, which is the Russian word for "magician". Accompanying Koldun on stage were two male dancers: Alexandr Bodyanski and Fredrik Olofsson, and two female dancers: Natalia and Ilona Donchenko, along with Mariam Merabova providing backing vocals.

At the end of the semi-final, Belarus was announced as having finished in the top ten and subsequently qualifying for the grand final. This marked the first time that Belarus qualified to the final of the Eurovision Song Contest from a semi-final since the introduction of semi-finals in 2004. It was later revealed that the Belarus placed fourth in the semi-final, receiving a total of 176 points.

Shortly after the semi-final, a winners' press conference was held for the ten qualifying countries. As part of this press conference, the qualifying artists took part in a draw to determine the running order of the final. This draw was done in the order the countries appeared in the semi-final running order. Belarus was drawn to perform in position 3, following the entry from Spain and before the entry from Ireland. Belarus placed sixth in the final, scoring 145 points, which is the best result for Belarus to date.

Voting 
Below is a breakdown of points awarded to Belarus and awarded by Belarus in the semi-final and grand final of the contest. The nation awarded its 12 points to Moldova in the semi-final and to Russia in the final of the contest.

Points awarded to Belarus

Points awarded by Belarus

References

2007
Countries in the Eurovision Song Contest 2007
Eurovision